The Fédération Internationale du Sport Universitaire (FISU) is responsible for the organization and governance of worldwide sports competitions for student-athletes between the ages of 17 and 25. It was founded in 1949 as the world governing body of national university sports organizations and currently has 174 member associations (National University Sport Federations) from five continents. Between 1949 and 2011, it was based in Brussels (Belgium); it was relocated to Lausanne (Switzerland) since 2011.

The FISU stages its events every two years. They currently include two Universiades (summer and winter) and 34 World University Championships. It also organizes conferences, forums and seminars to promote sport as a component of the educational system. FISU sanctions other competitions open to university students, such as the biennial World University Bridge Championships in contract bridge, "played under the auspices of the FISU".

In light of the 2022 Russian invasion of Ukraine, FISU banned Russian and Belarusian athletes and  national university sports federation officials from participating in FISU competitions and activities until at least the end of 2022, cancelled two FISU University World Cups in Russia and a FISU World University Championships in Belarus scheduled for 2022 (the FISU University World Cup Powerlifting from Moscow, the FISU University World Cup Rugby Sevens from Kazan, and the FISU World University Championship Waterski & Wakeboard from Belarus), and cancelled Russia's hosting of the FISU University World Cup Combat Sports and associated meetings scheduled for 2022. The FISU also suspended the hosting rights and postponed the 2023 Summer World University Games, to be held in Yekaterinburg.

Organization 
A General Assembly elects an executive committee for a four-year term. Oleg Matytsin was elected president for 2015–2019, succeeding Claude-Louis Gallien. The secretary-general and CEO is Eric Saintrond; vice-presidents are Leonz Eder, Luciano Cabral, Marian Dymalski, Leopold Senghor and Liguo Yang.

Past presidents include:

 1949–1961: Paul Schleimer
 1961–1999: Primo Nebiolo (ITA)
 1999–2011: George E. Killian (USA)
 2011–2015: Claude–Louis Gallien (FRA)

Events and sports

Universiade 

The FISU World University Games, formerly and commonly referred to as the Universiade, is an international sporting event staged every two years in a different city. There were 10,622 participants in Shenzhen, China, in 2011, and 174 participating countries in Daegu, Korea, in 2003.

The Summer Universiade includes 12 compulsory sports (15 compulsory disciplines):

The Winter Universiade includes eight compulsory sports and one to three optional sports are chosen by the host country.

One to three optional sports are chosen by the host country.

World University Championships 

While the Universiades are held in odd years, the FISU World University Championships are held in even years. It includes individual/team sports, indoor/outdoor sports, combat sports, mind sports and summer/winter sports.

See also 
 FISU World University Games
 Maison du Sport International
 International Olympic Committee
 International Academy of Sport Science and Technology
 Lausanne campus
 International School Sport Federation

References 

 

 
International sports organizations
Organisations based in Lausanne
Universiade
Sports organizations established in 1949
Student organizations established in 1949